Faysal Sawadogo (born 22 September 1996) is a male taekwondo practitioner from Burkina Faso.

Personal life
He studies Economics & Management at Grenoble Alpes University, Saint-Martin-d'Heres.

Career
He was named Athlete of the Year for 2017 by the Association of Sports Journalists of Burkina. He was a Bronze medalist at the 2019 African Games and also a bronze medalist at the European Club Championships in 2020. Faysal Sawadogo also won bronze in June 2021 at the African Taekwondo Championships, held in Dakar. He was selected for the Taekwondo at the 2020 Summer Olympics – Men's 80 kg.

References

External links
 

1996 births
Living people
Taekwondo practitioners at the 2020 Summer Olympics
Burkinabé male taekwondo practitioners
Olympic taekwondo practitioners of Burkina Faso
African Games bronze medalists for Burkina Faso
African Games medalists in taekwondo
Competitors at the 2019 African Games
21st-century Burkinabé people